Busk is a city located in Zolochiv Raion in Lviv Oblast (region) of western Ukraine. It hosts the administration of Busk urban hromada, one of the hromadas of Ukraine. Population: .

Until 18 July 2020 it was the administrative center of the Busk Raion, now disestablished.

Busk was the birthplace of Yevhen Petrushevych, the president of the West Ukrainian National Republic.

History 

Busk has a long history. First mentioned in 1097 in Primary Chronicle as Bug City (Ruthenian: бужьсъкъ городъ, buzhesk horod) in the context of the dispute between Rus' princes for border area between Principality of Halych and Volhynian principality. Bug City was named due to its location near Western Bug which locally is known as Bug river.

Busk was granted town charter in 1411 by Siemowit IV, Duke of Masovia. In the Polish–Lithuanian Commonwealth, it belonged to the Belz Voivodeship, and was the seat of a separate administrative unit, the Land of Busk. The town remained part of Poland until the first partition of Poland (1772), when it was seized by the Habsburg Empire, and remained in Austrian Galicia until late 1918. In the interwar period, Busk belonged to Kamionka Buska County, Tarnopol Voivodeship, until Soviet invasion of Poland (September 1939). In 1913, the population of Busk was 8,000, including 3,500 Poles, 2,700 Jews and 1,800 Ukrainians.

Busk had a very active Jewish community before World War II. The first synagogue was built in 1502. The old Jewish cemetery was renowned. On July 1, 1941, German forces occupied Busk. The Jewish population was transferred to a ghetto then murdered on May 21, 1943. 1500 Jews perished during this operation. A witness recalled of the executions of the Jews, "All middle-aged Jews were gathered to work. Then, they were taken to the execution site...while others dug the pits." Raisel Meltzak, a Jewish child from Busk, was among the first Holocaust survivors to have her testimony recorded when she was interviewed by David P. Boder at a home for displaced Jewish orphans in France on September 8, 1946.

Until 18 July 2020, Busk was the administrative center of Busk Raion. The raion was abolished in July 2020 as part of the administrative reform of Ukraine, which reduced the number of raions of Lviv Oblast to seven. The area of Busk Raion was merged into Zolochiv Raion.

International relations

Twin towns – Sister cities

Busk is twinned with
  Ropczyce in Poland

People 
 Alice Habsburg
 Yevhen Petrushevych
 Chanoch Dov Padwa
 Moritz Szeps
 Joseph Weinreb
 Nahman ben Samuel ha-Levi

References

External links 
 Official Web Page of the Busk District State Administrations of Lviv Oblast 
 Wayback Machine Archive – Official site of the Busk District State Administration 
 Site Busk

Cities in Lviv Oblast
Shtetls
Cities of district significance in Ukraine
Belz Voivodeship
Kingdom of Galicia and Lodomeria
Tarnopol Voivodeship
Holocaust locations in Ukraine